Stutchbury is a surname. People with that name include:

 Bridget Stutchbury, Canadian biologist
 Michael Stutchbury (born 1957), editor in chief of The Australian Financial Review
 Oliver Stutchbury (1927-2011), British politician. 
 Peter Stutchbury (born 1954), Australian architect
 Samuel Stutchbury (1798-1859), English naturalist and geologist

See also